Cardamomin (also known as cardamonin) is a chalconoid that has been isolated from several plants including Alpinia katsumadai and Alpinia conchigera. It has received growing attention from the scientific community due to the expectations toward its benefits to human health.

References

Chalconoids